Roger Torrent i Ramió (born 19 July 1979) is a Spanish politician and urban planner from Catalonia. A former mayor of the municipality of Sarrià de Ter in north-eastern Spain, Torrent was President of the Parliament of Catalonia from January 2018 until March 2021. Since 26 May 2021 he is the Minister of Business and Work of Catalonia.

Early life
Torrent was born on 19 July 1979 in Sarrià de Ter, a village in the Province of Girona in north-eastern Catalonia. He has a degree in political science and administration from the Autonomous University of Barcelona (UAB) and a master's degree in territorial and urban studies from the Polytechnic University of Catalonia and Pompeu Fabra University. He has a postgraduate degree in political communication from the UAB's Institut de Ciències Polítiques i Socials (Institute of Political and Social Sciences).

Career
Torrent joined the Young Republican Left of Catalonia, the youth wing of the Republican Left of Catalonia (ERC), in 1998 and in 2000 joined the ERC. He contested the 1999 local elections as a Republican Left of Catalonia-Acord Municipal (ERC-AM) electoral alliance candidate in Sarrià de Ter and was elected. He was re-elected at the 2003 and 2007 local elections. After the 2007 election ERC-AM formed an administration with the Convergence and Union (CiU) and Torrent became Mayor of Sarrià de Ter. He was re-elected at the 2011 and 2015 local elections.

Torrent was the secretary of regional parliamentary policy in the federation of Girona from 2000 to 2008 and the ERC spokesperson on the Diputació de Girona between 2011 and 2012. He was a member of the Municipal Commission of Catalonia and the Local Government Commission of Catalonia between 2007 and 2011 and is a member of the executive of the Association of Catalan Municipalities.

Torrent contested the 2012 regional election as a Republican Left of Catalonia–Catalonia Yes (ERC–CatSí) electoral alliance candidate in the Province of Girona and was elected to the Parliament of Catalonia. He was re-elected at the 2015 and 2017 regional elections. He was elected President of the Parliament of Catalonia on 17 January 2018, defeating Citizens candidate José María Espejo-Saavedra Conesa by 65 votes to 56 votes. He is the youngest president of the Catalan Parliament.

According to an investigation by The Guardian and El País, Torrent's phone was hacked using the Pegasus software from the NSO Group.

Personal life
Torrent is married and has two daughters. He is a keen runner and skier, and a fan of football and handball.

Electoral history

References

External links

 
 

1979 births
Living people
Autonomous University of Barcelona alumni
Mayors of places in Catalonia
Members of the 10th Parliament of Catalonia
Members of the 11th Parliament of Catalonia
Members of the 12th Parliament of Catalonia
Pompeu Fabra University alumni
Polytechnic University of Catalonia alumni
Presidents of the Parliament of Catalonia
Republican Left of Catalonia politicians